Fortune is both a surname and a given name. Notable people with the name include:

People

Surname
Amos Fortune (citizen of Jaffrey) (c. 1710–1801), African American ex-slave and businessman
Dion Fortune (1890–1946), born Violet Mary Firth, British occultist and author
Jesse Fortune (1930–2009), American Chicago blues singer
J.D. Fortune (1973), American singer and songwriter who fronted the band INXS from September 2005 till August 2011 
Jimmy Fortune (born 1955), American country music singer
Jimmy Fortune (born 1972), Irish jockey
John Fortune (1939–2013), British comedian best known for his work on the TV series Bremner, Bird and Fortune
Kwaku Fortune, Irish actor
Marc-Antoine Fortuné (born 1981), French Guianese football player
Quinton Fortune (born 1977), South African football player
Robert Fortune (1812–1880), Scottish botanist and traveller best known for introducing tea plants from China to India
Rose Fortune (1774–1864), African American businessperson and first female police officer in Canada
Scott Fortune (born 1966), American former volleyball player
Seán Fortune (1954–1999), Irish priest and alleged child molester
Sonny Fortune (1939–2018), American jazz musician
Steven Fortune, computer scientist, the namesake of Fortune's algorithm for the convex hull problem
Timothy Thomas Fortune (1856–1928), American orator, civil rights leader, journalist, writer, editor and publisher
Victor Fortune (1883–1949), British Army major general
William Fortune (businessman) (1863-1942), American businessman, journalist, and civic leader
William Fortune (1897-1947), American football player.

Given name
Fortune (circa 1743–1798), African-American slave
Fortune FitzRoy, Duchess of Grafton (1920- ) British Mistress of the Robes
Fortune Gallo (1878–1970), opera impresario
Fortune Gordien (1922–1990), American athlete, primarily in the discus throw
Fortuné Méaulle (1844–1901), French wood-engraver

Fictional characters
Amos Fortune (comics), DC Comics supervillain
Anna Fortune, DC Comics character
Dominic Fortune, Marvel Comics character
Reginald Fortune, fictional detective of H. C. Bailey
Fortune, character from Metal Gear Solid 2: Sons of Liberty
Ms. Fortune (real name Nadia), a character from the fighting game Skullgirls
Miss Fortune (real name Sarah), the Bounty Hunter, a playable champion character in the multiplayer online battle arena video game League of Legends